Chennai Ungalai Anbudan Varaverkirathu is a 2015 Tamil-language drama film, written and directed by Maruthu Pandian. The film stars an ensemble cast featuring Bobby Simha, Prabhanjayan, Sharanya Turadi and Linga amongst others. Music for the film was composed by the Camlin-Raja duo and the film released in April 2015 to moderate reviews.

Cast

 Bobby Simha as Chellapandi
 Alphonse Putharen as Dilli
 Prapanjayan as Nagaraj
 Sharanya Turadi as Vinodhini
 Linga as Karthik
 Panimalar
 I. B. Karthikeyan
 Watson Veeramani
 Nisha Krishnan
 Suganya
 Selvam
 Marudhu Pandian
 Jawahar
 Charles Suresh
 Dharumar
 Rajan
 Madhudapathi
 Kiran K Naveen
 Mendo
 Vicky Singh

Production
Maruthu Pandian revealed that the film would be a satire based on several experiences from his life, and would focus on bachelors who reside in small-sized rooms in large numbers across Chennai. As the film finished production works, Bobby Simha revealed that the venture was made as a short film and that the director had added extra scenes and portions, in order to make it feature length and make most of the actor's rise to fame after Jigarthanda (2014). Maruthu Pandian replied to the claim stating that Simha had been disregarding the project as a result of his newfound fame, and had demanded 35 lakh rupees to complete dubbing work.

Prior to release, the film won rave reviews from fellow directors on the preview circuit. Bharathiraja, Thiagarajan Kumararaja, Ram and Balaji Tharaneetharan all promoted the film, following its preview.

Soundtrack 
Soundtrack was composed by Camlin-Raja.
Mazhai thuligal - Anuradha Sriram
Velicham - Yasin Nizar

Release
The film opened in April 2015 to mixed reviews from critics, in contrast to the reports it generate before release. Sify.com gave the film a negative review, citing that it was "amateurish" and that it would have done better if it had "better dialogues, better actors, better screenplay, better production value, better technicalities, better theme and better climax". Likewise, the critic from Times of India wrote "the director is clearly going for a new-age vibe but with one leg rooted firmly in melodrama, the film ends up as a muddled affair".

References

External links

2015 films
2010s Tamil-language films
2015 drama films
Indian drama films